Comp is a hamlet in the Tonbridge and Malling district, in the English county of Kent.

History
In 1240, the town was known as Camp de Wrotha (an abbreviation of Wrotham). It then was Caumpes in 1251 and Compe in 1461.

The name is derived from the Old English word 'Camp' meaning campus or field.

Location 
It is near the town of Sevenoaks, the villages of Borough Green, Platt, Wrotham Heath and the hamlet of Crouch. It is near the Mereworth Woods, and Valley Wood and on Comp Lane (a minor road).

Transport 
For transport there is the Borough Green & Wrotham railway station, and the A25, the A20, the A227 road and the M26, M20 and M25 motorways nearby.

Places of interest 
It has a garden called Great Comp.

References 

 http://www.gardens-guide.com/gardenpages/_0106.htm

Hamlets in Kent
Tonbridge and Malling